Franco Brusati (4 August 1922 in Milan – 28 February 1993 in Rome) was an Italian screenwriter and director.

Biography 
He directed the internationally commended film hit Bread and Chocolate, one of the finest examples of Commedia all'italiana films in the 1970s.

In 1979, his film To Forget Venice was nominated for an Academy Award for Best International Feature Film at the 52nd Academy Awards. In Italy, the film was awarded the David di Donatello for Best Film.

In 1983, Brusati was a member of the jury at the 33rd Berlin International Film Festival.

Filmography

References

External links
Official website
 
Franco Brusati, Italian Director Of Movies and Plays, Dies at 66
Twentieth-century Italian Literature in English Translation - page 138

1920 births
1993 deaths
Film people from Milan
Italian film directors
20th-century Italian screenwriters
Italian male screenwriters
20th-century Italian male writers